Konet Island is an islet located 100 metres off the shores of Telok Gong in Kuala Sungai Baru, Malacca, Malaysia. It is connected to the mainland by a tombolo and is accessible by foot at low tide. Similar to Besar Island and according to local legends, the island is also believed to be the home of the elves known as Orang bunian.

See also
 Besar Island, Malacca
 Malacca Island

References 

Islands of Malacca
Tombolos